Avani Dias (born 15 November 1991) is a Sri Lankan Australian journalist and radio presenter. She is currently posted as the Australian Broadcasting Corporation (ABC)'s international foreign correspondent for South East Asia, based in New Delhi. Dias is perhaps best known for being the presenter of current affairs program Hack on youth radio station Triple J from 2020 to 2021, after succeeding Tom Tilley at the end of 2019.

Raised in South Western Sydney, Dias completed her tertiary education at the University of Sydney, where she wrote for the student newspaper Honi Soit. In her early career, she worked at independent radio station FBi Radio and the online newspaper The New Daily whilst also working as a production assistant at the ABC.  Dias received a cadetship at ABC News in 2015, becoming a video-journalist and later anchoring the Darwin 7PM News bulletin.

Dias has won and been nominated for various journalistic awards, including Public Interest Award at the New South Wales Premier's Multicultural Communications Awards in 2019.

Biography

Early life and education
Avani Dias was born on 15 November 1991, ​in Wattle Grove, New South Wales. Dias grew up in the south west of Sydney, Australia. The eldest of two siblings, Dias has one brother, Seth. Dias' mother is also a journalist at the ABC.

She completed her secondary schooling at Bankstown Grammar School in 2009, and completed her tertiary education at the University of Sydney. In early 2013, she was elected as one of ten editors for the university's student newspaper Honi Soit.

Career
Dias began her career with FBi Radio, which she credits as giving her "a start in media". Dias began working at the Australian Broadcasting Corporation (ABC) as a production assistant, before being awarded a cadetship with ABC News in 2015. She went on to work as a multi-platform and video-journalist for the ABC in Sydney and Darwin, later anchoring the Darwin 7PM News bulletin. In December 2019, Dias was announced as the new radio presenter for current affairs program Hack on the ABC's youth-focused radio station Triple J, which she hosted until December 2021. In 2021 it was announced that Dias would relocate to New Delhi to serve as the ABC's foreign correspondent for South East Asia.

Dias additionally wrote for The New Daily from 2015 to 2017.

Awards and nominations

New South Wales Premier's Multicultural Communications Awards

! 
|-
! scope="row"| 2019
| Premier's Multicultural Communications Awards
| Public Interest Award
| 
| 
|}

Walkley Awards

! 
|-
! scope="row"| 2019
| rowspan="3"| Walkley Awards
| Young Australian Journalist of the Year
| 
| 
|-
! scope="row"| 2020
| Radio/Audio News and Current Affairs
| 
| 
|-
! scope="row"| 2021
| Public Service Journalism Award
| 
| 
|}

NT Press Club Awards

! 
|-
! scope="row"| 2016
| rowspan="2"| NT Press Club Awards
| Young Journalist of the Year
| 
| 
|}

References

External links
 Profile on Triple J
 
 Avani Dias at Muck Rack

1991 births
Living people
Australian women journalists
Australian people of Sri Lankan descent
Australian radio presenters
Australian women radio presenters
FBi Radio presenters
People from Wattle Grove, New South Wales
Triple J announcers
University of Sydney alumni